Teenage Bonnie and Klepto Clyde is a 1993 American romantic crime film co-written and directed by John Shepphird and starring Maureen Flannigan as Bonnie and Scott Wolf as Clyde.

Premise 
A modern-day retelling of the story of 1930s bank robbers Bonnie and Clyde where two teenagers, Bonnie and Clyde, are drawn to a life of crime.  The two young lovers begin with shoplifting and work their way up to wanted felons as they make a run for the Mexican border.

Production 
Parts of the film were shot in Salt Lake City, Utah.

References

External links 

1990s American films
1990s black comedy films
1990s English-language films
1990s teen films
1990s road movies
1993 comedy films
1993 crime films
1993 directorial debut films
1993 films
1993 romance films
American black comedy films
American crime films
American road movies
American romance films
Couples
Cultural depictions of Bonnie and Clyde
Films scored by Terry Plumeri
Films shot in Salt Lake City
Romantic crime films